Septimiu is a Romanian male given name that may refer to:

 Septimiu Albini (1861–1919), journalist and political activist
 Septimiu Câmpeanu (born 1957), Romanian football striker
 Septimiu Călin Albuț (born 1981), Romanian football goalkeeper
 Septimiu Turcas, mayor of Șimleu Silvaniei

Romanian masculine given names